Lene Dammand Lund (born 30 November 1963) is a Danish architect and educator. Since April 2012, she has been rector of the schools of architecture, design and conservation at the Royal Danish Academy of Fine Arts.

Dammand Lund studied architecture at the Aarhus School of Architecture where she graduated in 1991. In 2004, she earned an MBA from the Copenhagen Business School. After working with Danish and international design studios, Dammand Lund was editor of the Danish architecture journal Arkitekten (1995-2002). She has also served as managing director of the SLA urban development consultancy (2006–12). She has been a member of the board of Freja Ejendomsforeningen since 2004 and of Signal Arkitektur since 2005.

Published works

References

1963 births
Living people
Danish architects
Danish women architects
Academic staff of the Royal Danish Academy of Fine Arts
20th-century Danish businesswomen
20th-century Danish businesspeople
21st-century Danish businesswomen
21st-century Danish businesspeople
Danish women academics
20th-century Danish educators
21st-century Danish educators
20th-century Danish women educators
21st-century Danish women educators